The 2001 Miller Lite 225 was a Championship Auto Racing Teams (CART) motor race held on June 3, 2001, at the Milwaukee Mile in West Allis, Wisconsin, USA. It was the 6th round of the 2001 CART FedEx Championship Series season. Team Rahal's Kenny Bräck scored his second career and second consecutive CART race win ahead of a resurgent Michael Andretti and rookie Scott Dixon.

Bräck's second win in a row cemented his status at the top of the drivers' standings, now thirty points ahead of 2nd place Hélio Castroneves. This was Andretti's first podium of the year and his first after leaving Newman/Haas Racing; he was the only car that seemed capable of challenging Bräck for the win as the race went on. Dixon, who had won at Nazareth earlier in the season, picked up his second career podium and PacWest Racing's final podium in the series.

The race saw multiple crashes take out several championship contenders, as Cristiano da Matta, in a repeat of the previous race at Motegi, crashed on Lap 1 with Castroneves; Paul Tracy then crashed a few laps later. Jimmy Vasser, who was running 3rd, was taken out by Tora Takagi while trying to lap him on Lap 132; Takagi would be disqualified two laps later for his role in the accident. Finally, Christian Fittipaldi and Nicolas Minassian collided near the end of the race, which would prompt Chip Ganassi Racing to drop the latter after the next race in Detroit.

Qualifying
Qualifying was rained out; the lineup was determined by points standings.

Race

– Includes one bonus point for leading the most laps.
 *The bonus point for pole position was not awarded as qualifying was rained out.

Race statistics
Lead changes: 12 among 9 drivers

Standings after the race

Drivers' standings 

Constructors' standings

Manufacturer's Standings

References

Miller Lite 225
Miller Lite 225
Motorsport in Wisconsin